Tumultes is a 1990 French-Belgian drama film directed by Bertrand Van Effenterre. It was screened in the Un Certain Regard section at the 1990 Cannes Film Festival.

Cast
 Julie Jézéquel - Anne
 Bruno Cremer - The Father
 Nelly Borgeaud - The Mother
 Clotilde de Bayser - Isabelle
 Laure Marsac - Claude
 Jean-Pierre Moulin - Le curé
 Jean-Paul Comart - Yves
 Christian Cloarec - Pierre
 Jean-Michel Portal - Bruno
 Guy Abgrall - Robin
 Jean-Christophe Bleton - Le danseur
 Stéphane Houy - Patrick

References

External links

1990 films
French drama films
Belgian drama films
1990s French-language films
1990 drama films
Films directed by Bertrand Van Effenterre
French-language Belgian films
1990s French films